Hermelinghen is a commune in the Pas-de-Calais department in the Hauts-de-France region of France.

Geography
A small farming village located 13 miles (19 km) south of Calais, on the D191 road. It is the source of the river Slack.

Population

Places of interest
 The church of St. Agathe, dating from the eighteenth century.
 The ruins of an ancient castle.

See also
Communes of the Pas-de-Calais department

References

External links

 Statistical data, INSEE

Communes of Pas-de-Calais